Mirosława Agnieszka Stachowiak-Różecka (born 8 July 1973) is a Polish politician. She was elected to the Sejm (9th term) representing the constituency of Wrocław. She previously also served in the 8th term of the Sejm (2015–2019).

References 

Living people
1973 births
Place of birth missing (living people)
21st-century Polish politicians
21st-century Polish women politicians
Members of the Polish Sejm 2015–2019
Members of the Polish Sejm 2019–2023
Women members of the Sejm of the Republic of Poland